Vila Madalena is a station on Line 2 (Green) of the São Paulo Metro and as of   is the current terminus.

Station layout

SPTrans lines
The following SPTrans bus lines can be accessed. Passengers may use a Bilhete Único card for transfer:

EMTU lines
The following EMTU bus lines can be accessed:

Notelist

References

São Paulo Metro stations
Railway stations opened in 1998
1998 establishments in Brazil
Railway stations located underground in Brazil